Henry Collins Walsh (1863–1927) was a journalist, historian, explorer of Central America and Greenland, a founding member of the Arctic Club of America (1894),  and the nominal founder of The Explorers Club (1904). 

He is associated with the Henry Altemus Company of Philadelphia.

Edited works
Dante's Inferno - Dante Alighieri 
Poems of John Milton 
Paradise Lost - John Milton 
Purgatory and Paradise - Dante Alighieri
Account of the F.A. Cook arctic expedition via Labrador to Sukkertoppen
The Rime of the Ancient Mariner - Samuel Taylor Coleridge 
Idylls of the King, and other Arthurian poems - Alfred Lord Tennyson
American Notes and Queries, Volume 1

Works by Walsh
The Last Cruise of the Miranda - A Record of Arctic Adventure (1895)
By the Potomac and Other Verses (1889)

References

1863 births
1927 deaths
American male journalists
American historians